Emamzadeh Deh Chal (also Romanized as Emāmzādeh Deh Chāl; also known as Emāmzādeh, Kalācha, and Qal‘ehcheh) is a village in Deh Chal Rural District, in the Central District of Khondab County, Markazi Province, Iran. At the 2006 census, its population was 472, in 117 families.

References 

Populated places in Khondab County